Swedish Pro Tennis Championships is a now defunct men's tennis championship only played in 1972 and 1973.

History
The Swedish Pro Tennis Championships were created in Gothenburg, Sweden, as part of the 1972 WCT circuit, as one of the four non-American events of the tour, with the Canada International of Essen, Germany, and the Rotterdam Indoors of Rotterdam, Netherlands. The first tournament in 1972 (which field included a sixteen-year-old Björn Borg), saw the victory of eventual WCT year-end No. 1 John Newcombe, and the second, of 1973's Group A leader Stan Smith. Like many events of the WCT, the Swedish Pro was quickly discontinued as the circuit was searching for new locations to improve its list of tournaments. Gothenburg continued to host Sweden's national championships, as well as Davis Cup ties, and several exhibitions, like the 1976-Rod Laver/Björn Borg challenge match, but the city's international tennis tournament was never revived.

Past finals

Singles

Doubles

References

External links
Association of Tennis Professionals (ATP) World Tour official website
International Tennis Federation (ITF) official website

 
Hard court tennis tournaments
Tennis tournaments in Sweden
World Championship Tennis
Defunct tennis tournaments in Europe
Defunct tennis tournaments in Sweden
Defunct sports competitions in Sweden
1972 establishments in Sweden
1973 disestablishments in Sweden
Recurring sporting events established in 1972
Recurring sporting events disestablished in 1973